HASI was a non-legal Basque political party.

HASI may also refer to:

 18110 HASI, a main-belt asteroid
 Hubbard Association of Scientologists International, a scientology organization founded in 1954

See also

 Hasi (disambiguation)